The Arduboy is a handheld game console with open source software, based on the Arduino hardware platform.

History

Development

In preparation for a consumer version, the developer moved to Shenzhen, China to work on the Arduboy at the HAX accelerator.

A non-production smaller formfactor "Arduboy Mini" was demonstrated in 2019. Another non-production system, the "Arduboy Nano" was demonstrated in 2021 with a smaller formfactor than the Arduboy Mini.

Consumer versions
A Kickstarter campaign was being planned in 2014. Development was funded through a Kickstarter campaign in 2015. The launch price of the original Arduboy was either $29 or $39.

In August 2020, Arduboy announced 'Arduboy FX', an upgraded version that includes a flash memory chip that stores over 250 games on the device itself. This version shipped around 2021 at a price of $54.

Tetris Microcard

As well as the open-source Arduboy itself, a single-game version featuring an officially licensed (non-open) version of Tetris is also available.

Hardware
The Arduboy is open source.

The compute platform of the Arduboy is based on that of the Arduino. Both the Arduboy and the Arduboy FX use an 8-bit ATMega32u4 microcontroller as the primary processor, RAM, and storage device of the system. The system ships with 2.5 kilobytes of RAM.

The Arduboy has 32 kilobytes of flash storage, as well as 1 kilobyte of EEPROM. The Arduboy FX features additional storage through the use of an official modchip, installed either from the factory or aftermarket.

The system uses an  128x64px 1-bit OLED display.

Audio is handled by stereo Piezoelectric speakers.

The system is powered for about 5-8 hours on a rechargeable thin film lithium polymer battery with a capacity of 180 mAh. The system has a microUSB connector. The console can also be used as a simple controller or input device for other systems.

Casing is made from both aluminum and polycarbonate.

References

External links

Arduino
Handheld game consoles
Kickstarter-funded video game consoles
Monochrome video game consoles
Open hardware electronic devices